The Chinese Ambassador to Serbia is the official representative of the People's Republic of China to the Republic of Serbia.

List of representatives

See also
China–Serbia relations

References 

 
Serbia
China